Sadat Mahalleh (also Romanized as Sādāt Maḩalleh) is a village in Esbu Kola Rural District, in the Central District of Babol County, Mazandaran Province, Iran. At the 2006 census, its population was 483, in 125 families.

References 

Populated places in Babol County